Green-Wood Cemetery is a  cemetery in Brooklyn, New York City. The cemetery lies several blocks southwest of Prospect Park, and is generally bounded by 20th Street to the northeast, Fifth Avenue to the northwest, 36th and 37th Streets to the southwest, Fort Hamilton Parkway to the south, and McDonald Avenue to the east. Green-Wood Cemetery was founded in 1838 as a rural cemetery.

A
 Samuel Akerly (1785–1845), founder of the New York Institute for the Blind
 Augustus Chapman Allen (1806–1864), co-founder of the City of Houston
 Harvey A. Allen (1818?–1882), United States Army officer, was Commander of the Department of Alaska 1871–1873
 Albert Anastasia (1903–1957), mobster and contract killer for Murder, Inc.
 Othniel Boaz Askew (1972–2003; cremated), politician and assassin of New York City Council member James E. Davis, whose remains were relocated to another cemetery

B
 Walter W. Bahan (1860–1916), lawyer and member New York State Assembly
 James Bard (1815–1897), marine artist, buried in unmarked grave
 Peter Townsend Barlow (1857–1921), New York City Magistrate
 Susie M. Barstow (1836-1923), landscape painter associated with the Hudson River School
Jean-Michel Basquiat (1960–1988), artist
 William Holbrook Beard (1824–1900), painter of Bulls and Bears representing the market cycle; a bear statue sits on top of his headstone
 Henry Ward Beecher (1813–1887), abolitionist
 George Wesley Bellows (1882–1925), painter
 James Gordon Bennett, Sr. (1795–1872), founder/publisher of the New York Herald
 Richard Rodney Bennett (1936–2012; cremated), composer of film, TV and concert music
 Henry Bergh (1818–1888), founder of the American Society for the Prevention of Cruelty to Animals
 Leonard Bernstein (1918–1990), pianist, composer, and conductor; alongside his wife, actress Felicia Montealegre (1922–1978)
 Sid Bernstein (1918–2013), American music promoter
 Jane Augusta Blankman (1823–1860), courtesan
 Samuel Blatchford (1820–1893), U.S. Supreme Court Justice
 Stanley Bosworth (1927–2011), Founding headmaster of prestigious Saint Ann's School
 William R. Brewster (1828–1869), Civil War Union Brevet Brigidier General
 Andrew Bryson (1822–1892), United States Navy rear admiral

C
 Charlotte Canda (1828–1845), a debutante killed in a carriage accident on her 17th birthday
 Elliott Carter (1908–2012), composer
 Alice Cary (1820–1871), poet, author
 Phoebe Cary (1824–1871), poet, author
 George Catlin (1796–1872), painter of Native Americans in the Old West
 Henry Chadwick (1824–1908), Baseball Hall of Fame member (memorial)
 William Merritt Chase (1849–1916), painter, teacher
 Kate Claxton (1850–1924), American theatre actress noted for her role of Louise in the play The Two Orphans
 DeWitt Clinton (1769–1828), unsuccessful U.S. presidential candidate 1812; U.S. Senator from New York; seventh and ninth Governor of New York
 Henry Ives Cobb Jr., (1883-1974), artist and architect
 William Colgate, (1783-1853), English-American soap industrialist who founded in 1806 what became the Colgate-Palmolive company.
 Barry Commoner (1917–2012), American environmentalist, professor and presidential candidate
 William J. Coombs (1833–1922), U.S. Congressman from Brooklyn
 George H. Cooper (1821–1891), United States Navy rear admiral
 Peter Cooper (1791–1883), inventor, manufacturer, abolitionist, founder of Cooper Union
 James Creighton, Jr. (1841–1862), first pitcher to throw a fastball
 Edwin Pearce Christy (1815–1862), minstrel, known for performing the Stephen Foster song "Old Folks at Home" (aka "Swanee River")
 Bruce Crane (1857-1937), painter
George Washington Cullum (1809–1892), Superintendent of the United States Military Academy
 Nathaniel Currier (1813–1888), artist ("Currier and Ives")
 Duncan Curry (1812–1894), baseball pioneer and insurance executive
 Elizabeth Cushier (1837–1931), professor of medicine and for 25 years before her retirement in 1900, one of New York's most prominent obstetricians
 Bronson M. Cutting (1888–1935), United States Senator from New Mexico (1927–1928; 1929–1935)

D
 Marcus Daly (1841–1900), Irish-born copper industrialist in Montana
 James E. Davis (1962–2003), assassinated City Councilman, was buried here for a few days; upon learning his killer's ashes were also in Green-Wood, his family had his body exhumed and reinterred in the Cemetery of the Evergreens
 Charles Schuyler De Bost (1826–1895), baseball pioneer
 Richard Delafield (1798–1873), Chief of Engineers and Superintendent of West Point
 Francis E. Dorn (1911–1987), U.S. Naval Commander, attorney and member of the U.S. House of Representatives from New York's 12th congressional district
 Mabel Smith Douglass (1874–1933), founder and first dean of the New Jersey College for Women
 Dorothea A. Dreier (1870-1923), painter
Katherine Sophie Dreier (1877-1952), artist and social reformer
Thomas Clark Durant (1820–1885), key figure in building the First transcontinental railroad
 William West Durant (1850–1934), son of Thomas Clark Durant and designer and developer of camps in the Adirondack Great Camp style
 James Durno (1795–1873), husband of labor activist Sarah Bagley (1806–1883)

E
 Fred Ebb (1928–2004), lyricist
 Charles Ebbets (1859–1925), baseball team (Brooklyn Dodgers) owner; built Ebbets Field
 Elizabeth F. Ellet (1818–1877), American writer and poet
 Georgia Engelhard (1906–1985), mountaineer in the Canadian Rockies and the Selkirk ranges.  Niece of Alfred Stieglitz and his wife, Georgia O'Keeffe.
 Philip Evergood (1901–1973), was an American painter, etcher, lithographer, sculptor, illustrator and writer
 George Edwin Ewing (1828–1884), Scottish sculptor

F
 Charles Feltman (1841–1910), claimed to be the first person to put a hot dog on a bun
 Edward Ferrero (1831–1899), American Civil War General at the Battle of the Crater and in the Appomattox Campaign
 Eunice Newton Foote  (1819–1888),  was an American scientist, physicist, inventor, and women's rights campaigner from Seneca Falls, New York. Her experiments on the warming effect of sunlight on different gases were overlooked until the 21st century
 Edwin Forbes (1839–1895), American Civil War and postbellum artist, illustrator, and etcher
 Lockwood de Forest (1850–1932), American painter, interior designer, and furniture designer
 Margaretta and Catherine Fox (1833–1893; 1837–1892), mediums and important figures in the Spiritualism movement
 Isaac Kaufmann Funk (1839–1912), American editor, lexicographer, publisher, and spelling reformer

G
 Joey Gallo (1929–1972), mobster
 William Delbert Gann (1878–1955), Stock Market author and visionary
 Mary Gannon ("Mrs George Stevenson"; 1829–1868), American stage actress and comedienne 
 Asa Bird Gardiner (1839–1919), controversial soldier, attorney, and prosecutor
 Robert Selden Garnett (1819–1861), brigadier general of the Confederate States Army and the first general killed in the American Civil War
 Henry George (1839–1897), writer, politician and economist
 Henry George, Jr. (1862–1916), United States Representative from New York
 Louis Moreau Gottschalk (1829–1869), composer
 John Franklin Gray (1804–1882), the first practitioner of Homeopathy in the United States
 Horace Greeley (1811–1872), unsuccessful U.S. presidential candidate 1872; founder of the New York Tribune
 Robert Stockton Green (1831–1895), Governor of New Jersey
 Dudley Sanford Gregory (1800–1874), first mayor of Jersey City, U.S. House of Representatives (1847–1849)
 Rufus Wilmot Griswold (1815–1857), literary critic

H
 Ann Hall (1792-1863), painter and popular 19th-century miniaturist
Edward Wheeler Hall (1881–1922), one of the victims of the Hall–Mills murder case
 Frances Noel Stevens Hall (1874–1942), wife of Edward and suspect in the Hall–Mills murder
 Paul Hall (1914–1980), labor leader
 Henry Wager Halleck (1815–1872), U.S. Army Commander during the middle part of the American Civil War
 William Stewart Halsted (1852–1922), pioneer in American medicine and surgery, often credited as the "Father of Modern American Surgery"
 Jeremiah Hamilton (1806/1807–1875), "the only black millionaire in New York" around the time of the American Civil War
 William John Hammond (1797–1848), British actor-manager and comedian
 John Hardy (1835–1913), member of the U.S. House of Representatives from New York
 Townsend Harris (1804–1878), first U.S. Consul General to Japan
 Nathaniel H. Harris (1834–1900), Confederate brigadier general during the American Civil War
 William S. Hart (1864–1946), star of silent "Western" movies
 John A. Hartwell (1861–1940), noted athlete, philanthropist, pioneer in American surgery, and personal physician of Theodore Roosevelt
 Thomas Hastings (1784–1872), wrote the music to the hymn "Rock of Ages"
 Genevieve Hecker (1883–1960), champion golfer
 Joseph Henderson (1826–1890), notable harbor pilot
 Philip A. Herfort (1851–1921), violinist and orchestra leader
 Abram S. Hewitt (1822–1903), Teacher, lawyer, iron manufacturer, U.S. Congressman, and a mayor of New York; son-in-law of Peter Cooper
 Henry B. Hidden (c. 1839–1862), American Civil War cavalry officer
 Grace Webster Haddock Hinsdale (1832–1902), author
 DeWolf Hopper (1858–1935), actor
 Charles Horman (1942–1973), journalist, murdered in Chile by the regime of Augusto Pinochet, subject of the film Missing
 Elizabeth Horman (1904-2001), artist
Elias Howe (1819–1867), invented the sewing machine (see Walter Hunt)
 James Howell (1829–1897), 19th mayor of Brooklyn
 Walter Hunt (1785–1869), invented the safety pin

I
 Angelo Ippolito (1922-2001), color field painter
Richard Isay (1934–2012), psychiatrist, psychoanalyst, author, gay activist
 James Merritt Ives (1824–1895), artist ("Currier and Ives")

J
 Paul Jabara (1948–1992), actor, singer and songwriter
 Abraham Jacobi (1830–1919), the Father of American Pediatrics                                                                                                                                        
 Leonard Jerome (1817–1891), entrepreneur, grandfather of Winston Churchill
 Morris Ketchum Jesup (1830–1908), founder of YMCA New York and president of the American Museum of Natural History
 Eastman Johnson (1824–1906), American painter, and co-founder of the Metropolitan Museum of Art, New York City
 James Weldon Johnson (1871–1938), American author, educator, lawyer, diplomat, songwriter, and civil rights activist. Author of "Lift Every Voice and Sing" with his wife Grace Nail Johnson
 Tom L. Johnson (1854–1911), former mayor of Cleveland, Ohio
 Willard F. Jones (1890–1967), naval architect, head of National Safety Council's marine section and Vice President of Gulf Oil
 Bashar Barakah Jackson (Pop Smoke) (1999–2020), rapper

K
 Laura Keene (1826–1873), actress who was on stage when Lincoln was shot
 Włodzimierz Krzyżanowski (1824–1887), Polish American engineer, politician, and brigadier general in the Union Army. On 13 October 1937, the 50th anniversary of his death, his remains were transferred with military honors to Arlington National Cemetery.
 Tuli Kupferberg (1923–2010), musician and poet; co-founder of The Fugs
 Charles J. Kurth (1862–1896), lawyer and politician

L
 Florence La Badie (1888–1917), actress
 John La Farge (1835–1910), artist
 Laura Jean Libbey (1862–1924), popular "dime-store" novelist
 Brockholst Livingston (1757–1823), U.S. Supreme Court Justice
 William Livingston (1723–1790), signer of the U.S. Constitution; first Governor of New Jersey
 Pierre Lorillard IV (1833–1901), tobacco tycoon, introduced the tuxedo to the U.S.

M
 John W. Mackay (1831–1902), millionaire, one of the Bonanza Kings of Virginia City, NV and the Comstock Lode
 Alfred Henry Maurer (1868-1932), modernist painter
James Maury (1746–1840), first U.S. consul to Liverpool, England
 Ormsby M. Mitchel (1805–1862), American astronomer and major general in the American Civil War
 Henry James Montague (1840–1878), stage actor
 Lola Montez (1821–1861), actress and mistress of many notable men among them King Ludwig I of Bavaria
 Charles Morgan (17951878), shipping magnate
 Frank Morgan (1890–1949), actor (The Wizard of Oz)
 Samuel F. B. Morse (1791–1872), invented Morse code, language of the telegraph
Nicholas Muller (1836 - 1917), U.S. Congressman

N
 William Niblo (1790–1878), also known as Billy Niblo, the owner of Niblo's Garden

O
 Violet Oakley (1874–1961), artist

P
 James Kirke Paulding (1779–1860), U.S. Secretary of the Navy under Martin Van Buren
 Mary Ellis Peltz (1896–1981), American drama and music critic, magazine editor, poet and writer on music.
 Carmine Persico, (1933–2019), American mobster
 Anson Greene Phelps (1781–1853), founder of Phelps, Dodge mining and copper company
 Duncan Phyfe (1770–1854), cabinetmaker
 Hezekiah Pierrepont (1768–1838) merchant and founder of Brooklyn Heights, Brooklyn
 Arthur Tappan Pierson (1837–1911), an American Presbyterian pastor, Christian leader, missionary and writer
 William "Bill The Butcher" Poole (1821–1855), a member of the Bowery Boys gang and the Know Nothing political party; also a bare-knuckle boxer

R
 Henry Jarvis Raymond (1820–1869), American journalist and politician and founder of The New York Times
 Samuel C. Reid (1783–1861), suggested the design upon which all U.S. flags since 1818 have been based
 John Roach (1815–1887), founder of shipbuilding company Roach & Sons
 Alice Roosevelt (1861–1884), first wife of U.S. President Theodore Roosevelt
 Martha Bulloch Roosevelt (1834–1884), mother of U.S. President Theodore Roosevelt
 Robert Roosevelt (1829–1906), uncle of U.S. President Theodore Roosevelt
 Theodore Roosevelt, Sr. (1831–1878), father of U.S. President Theodore Roosevelt
 Henry Rutgers (1745–1830), Revolutionary War hero, philanthropist, namesake of Rutgers University

S
 George Nicholas Sanders (1812–1873), Union sympathizer with the Confederacy, said to have planned the assassination of Abraham Lincoln
 William Cary Sanger (1853–1921), United States Assistant Secretary of War from 1901 to 1903
 Ira Sankey (1840–1908), hymn composer
 Frederick August Otto Schwarz (1836–1911), founder of specialty toy retailer FAO Schwarz
 Peter Sharpe (1777–1842), American politician, served as a United States Representative from New York
 Eli Siegel (1902–1978), poet, educator, founder of the philosophy Aesthetic Realism
 J. Marion Sims (1813–1883), physician called "founder of modern gynecology".
 John D. Sloat (1781–1867), United States Navy commodore, claimed California for the U.S.
 Henry Warner Slocum (1827–1894), Union general in the American Civil War, U.S. Representative from New York
 Ole Singstad (1882–1969), Norwegian-American civil engineer, designed Lincoln Tunnel and others
 Francis Barretto Spinola (1821–1891), first Italian-American elected to the U.S. House of Representatives
 Emma Stebbins (1815–1882), artist, sculptor of Bethesda Fountain
 George Steers (1819–1856), designer of the Yacht America, winner of the first America's Cup.
 Henry Steinway (1797–1871), founder of Steinway & Sons, piano manufacturers
 William Steinway (1836–1896), son of Henry Steinway, and founder of Steinway, New York
 John Austin Stevens Jr. (1827–1910), founder of Sons of the Revolution
 Susan McKinney Steward (1847–1918), one of the first black women to earn a medical degree, and the first in the state of New York
 Lynne Stewart (1939–2017), civil rights lawyer
 Clara Harrison Stranahan (1831–1905), author; founder and trustee of Barnard College
 James S. T. Stranahan (1808–1898), "Father of Prospect Park", instrumental promoter of the park, the Brooklyn Bridge, and the consolidation of Brooklyn into Greater New York
 Francis Scott Street (1831–1883), co-owner of Street & Smith publishers
 Silas Stringham (1798–1876), long-serving United States Navy officer during the American Civil War and War of 1812
 George Crockett Strong (1832–1863), Union brigadier general in the American Civil War
 Thomas William "Fightin' Tom" Sweeny (1820–1892), Irish immigrant and American Civil War general

T
 John Thomas (1805–1871), founder of The Christadelphians
 Louis Comfort Tiffany (1848–1933), artist
 Matilda Tone (or Mathilda) (1769–1849), widow of Irish rebel Wolfe Tone
 Robert H. Torsney (1935-2009), New York City Police Department officer who murdered Randolph Evans in 1976.
 George Francis Train (1829–1904), railroad promoter
 Juan Trippe (1899–1981), airline pioneer, headed Pan Am from 1927 to 1968
 Robert Troup (1756–1832), Revolutionary War hero, New York State assemblyman and Judge; body moved to Green-Wood in 1872
 William Magear "Boss" Tweed (1823–1878), notorious New York political boss, member of the U.S. House of Representatives and New York State Senate

U
 Camilla Urso (1842–1902), French violinist

V
 Steven C. Vincent (1955–2005), American journalist and author kidnapped and murdered in Iraq in August 2005
 Ned Vizzini (1981–2013), American author
 Leopold von Gilsa (1824–1870), American Civil War colonel and brigade commander

W
 Charles S. Wainwright (1826–1907), American Civil War colonel and artillery officer
 Henry John Whitehouse (1803–1874), Episcopal bishop
 Thomas R. Whitney (1807–1858), member of the U.S. House of Representatives from New York
 Barney Williams (1824–1876), Irish-American actor-comedian
 Beekman Winthrop (1874–1940), governor of Puerto Rico from 1904 to 1907, and later an Assistant Secretary of the Treasury
 Frank Worthing (1866-1910), actor

Y
 Jonathan Young (1826–1885), United States Navy commodore

References

 
Burials at Green-Wood Cemetery
Green-Wood Cemetery